Salome with the Head of John the Baptist (London), c. 1607/1610, is a painting by the Italian master Caravaggio now in the collection of the  National Gallery in London.

History

The painting was discovered in a private collection in 1959. The early Caravaggio biographer Giovanni Bellori, writing in 1673, mentions a Salome with the Head of John the Baptist sent by the artist to the Grand Master of the Knights of Malta in the hope of regaining favour after having been expelled from the Order in 1608. It seems likely, however, that Bellori was referring to a different painting by Caravaggio of the same subject (see Salome with the Head of John the Baptist at the Royal Palace of Madrid). The handling and the raking light link this painting to works done in Naples during the artist's brief stay in the city during 1606–1607, an impression confirmed by the balances between Salome and the Virgin in the Madonna of the Rosary, and between the executioner holding the head of the Baptist and one of the two torturers in Christ at the Column and The Flagellation of Christ. From November to February 2012–2013, this painting was part of the exhibition "Bodies and Shadows: Caravaggio and His Legacy" at the LACMA.

See also
Salome with the Head of John the Baptist (Caravaggio), Madrid
Beheading of Saint John the Baptist
List of paintings by Caravaggio

References

External links

1607 paintings
Paintings by Caravaggio
Collections of the National Gallery, London
Paintings about death
Paintings depicting Salome
Paintings depicting John the Baptist
Christian art about death